Valcambi is a precious metals refining company located in Balerna, Switzerland, and a company of Rajesh Exports Limited. Valcambi is owned by European Gold Refineries, which is owned by Global Gold Refineries AG, which in turn is 95% owned by REL Singapore PTE Ltd. and 5% by Rajesh Exports Limited India. Valcambi is thus 100%  controlled by Rajesh Exports, the parent company of REL Singapore.

They refine gold, silver, platinum and palladium into various forms including cast and minted bars, rounds, coins, and other semi-finished casting products. It is among the world's largest precious metals refiners, and refines more gold than any other. Additionally, the company provides precious metals assay, transportation, and storage services.

History 
The company was formed on May 15, 1961 as Valori & Cambi by a group of 5 Swiss businessmen/entrepreneurs from Mendrisio.  The name was changed to Valcambi on June 30, 1967. In 1967, Credit Suisse bought 50% of the Valcambi refinery, followed by the purchase of another 30% stake in 1968. The remaining 20% was purchased in 1980, giving Credit Suisse 100% control of the firm.

In 2003, European Gold Refineries SA purchased 100% of Valcambi from Credit Suisse for approximately $400 Million.

References

External links 
 Valcambi company website
 Rajesh Exports Limited company website

Manufacturing companies of Switzerland
Precious metals
Precious metal alloys
Manufacturing companies established in 1961
Bullion dealers
Swiss companies established in 1961
2015 mergers and acquisitions